The Quebec Writers’ Federation (QWF) is a not-for-profit registered charitable organization representing and serving the English-language literary community in the province of Quebec, Canada.

QWF is a literary arts presenter, provides professional development to established and emerging writers, runs community literary education programs, administers the Quebec Writers’ Federation Awards annually, and publishes the not-for-profit literary journal carte blanche.

The QWF also curates the QWF Literary Database of Quebec English-language authors, a searchable online compendium that represents the physical QWF collection of over 2,180 books by Quebec English-language authors, housed at the Atwater Library and Computer Centre.

The QWF is based in Westmount (Montreal), Canada.

History 
QWF was founded in 1998 from two predecessor organizations, the Quebec Society for the Promotion of English-Language Literature (QSPELL) and the Federation of English-language Writers of Quebec (FEWQ).

In 2013, the QWF celebrated its fifteenth anniversary, with a gala at the Virgin Mobile Corona Theatre.

References

The Quebec Community Groups Network: Quebec Writers’ Federation  
English-Language Arts Network: Quebec Writers’ Federation
Montreal Mosaic Web Magazine: Quebec Writers’ Federation
Canadian Broadcasting Corporation: “Quebec Writers Federation 15th anniversary.” November 17, 2013.
The Montreal Gazette: "Quebec Writers' Federation awards reflect booming local scene." November 5, 2019.

External links
The Quebec Writers’ Federation. Official website
Canadian writers' organizations
Organizations based in Montreal
Professional associations based in Quebec
Companies established in 1981
1981 establishments in Quebec